The Villalobos Brothers are a Mexican trio of violinists, singer-songwriters, composers, and multi- instrumentalists. They have performed at the Latin Grammy Awards, Carnegie Hall, the Solomon R. Guggenheim Museum, the Metropolitan Museum of Art, the 60th Anniversary of the United Nations, the Rainbow Room at Rockefeller Center, the New York Mets field at Shea Stadium, and other historic venues.

They have accompanied and collaborated with artists including Morley, Paloma San Basilio, Paddy Moloney and The Chieftains, Eddie Palmieri, Graciela, Dolly Parton, León Gieco, Leni Stern, César Camargo Mariano, Lila Downs, Richie Ray & Bobby Cruz, Pierre Boulez, Alberto Vázquez, Johnny Ventura, Dan Zanes and Rafael Escalona. Their first solo album, "Villa-Lobos", was released in 2009.

Early years and education

Early years
The Villalobos Brothers were born and raised in Xalapa, Mexico, an hour away from the port city of Veracruz. They spent their childhood listening to their grandmother, Cristina Vásquez play music for enjoyment after the work day, accompanying dancers at a country fandango, or playing for guests dining in the many coastal restaurants. The trio learned the violin at a young age, and soon learned to sing and play other instruments, including the guitar, the piano and the thin-bodied guitars by the name of jaranas. They eventually moved on to specialize in classical violin and composition, which further developed into the creation of their own style of playing, called "Fast-Chatting Violin" which involves a rapid succession of notes and percussive sounds that imitate the human voice.

From 1990 to 2000 they studied classical violin with Carlos Marrufo Gurrutia, and composition and counterpoint with Eugeniusz Sleziak Kandora, Roberto Lira López, and Ryszard Siwy Machalica.

The Villalobos Brothers were considered child prodigies and had early soloist debuts with the Xalapa Symphony Orchestra playing the Sibelius, Brahms, and Saint-Saëns violin concertos. They also had solo appearances with the National Symphony Orchestra of Cuba, and the National Symphony Orchestra of Peru.

Advanced musical studies
In 2000, the U.S. Department of State awarded the eldest brother, Ernesto Villalobos, a Fulbright Grant to carry out graduate studies at the Manhattan School of Music, where he studied with Patinka Kopec and Nils Vigeland. In 2001 he performed at Master Classes led by Pinchas Zukerman and Glenn Dicterow and travelled to Israel to study with Shlomo Mintz.

The middle brother, Alberto Villalobos, left Mexico in 2002 and studied violin with Igor Oistrakh at the Royal Conservatory of Brussels for three years. He was later selected as a student by Pierre Boulez at the Lucerne Festival Academy in Switzerland. In 2003 he performed at Master Classes led by Zakhar Bron.

In 2003 the youngest brother, Luis Villalobos, moved to Germany, where he studied violin with Nicolas Chumachenco at the Hochschule für Musik Freiburg. He was also accepted at the prestigious Mozarteum University of Salzburg in Austria.

Style and influences

Although the three Villalobos Brothers are classically trained on the violin, their music draws influence from many genres, including Son Jarocho (a musical style from their native city of Veracruz). Jarocho describes the unique style as being created by the people and culture of the southern coastal plain of Veracruz, who for more than two centuries have shaped a distinctive regional music which intertwines fundamentals of Jazz, Rock and Blues.

Most of their original music features complex patterns of interwoven three-violin harmonies, intricate call-and-response arrangements and lyrical melodies carried out by one of the brothers as the other two reinforce it in counterpoint.

While touring in support of their album, Ernesto Villalobos noted, "Due to our training in different parts of the world, each brother brings something unique to the table: From my years in New York and Israel my violin playing style and technique are closest to the Galamian, or American school. Alberto studied in Belgium under Igor Oistrakh, perfecting the Russian school and Luis followed the German school under Nicolas Chumachenco. But in the end these are of course only labels...We grew up together, making music together for many years in the tropics of Veracruz, Mexico"

In addition, The Villalobos Brothers have created their own signature style of violin playing called "Fast-Chatting Violin" by incorporating elements of classical music, jazz and indigenous Son Jarocho and Son Huasteco, a genre extensively researched and embraced by Alberto Villalobos. In 2009 he spent a year in the Huasteca region of Veracruz recording and transcribing Sones Huastecos that have been verbally passed down for centuries from generation to generation and were in danger of being lost.

Carnegie Hall concerts

Joan and Sanford I. Weill Recital Hall

On 23 October 2005 The Villalobos Brothers reunited in New York City for their debut recital at Carnegie Hall. The concert was also a sold-out benefit for The Shul of New York and included the following musicians:

Carlos Pereira piano and guitar, Matt Snyder clarinet, Kathleen Tagg piano, Dave Hertzberg bass, Ramón Ponce Jr. vihuela and guitarrón, Ilmar Gavilán violin, Humberto Flores guitar, An Vanhauwaert violin, Morley Kamen voice, Adam Feder guitar, Cristina Vásquez voice, Yamani Fuentes flute, Seth Ginsberg mandolin, Daniel Sadownick percussion.

Isaac Stern Auditorium / Ronald O. Perelman Stage
On 17 December 2006, The Villalobos Brothers were invited back to Carnegie Hall, this time leading the music program for Calpulli Mexican Dance Company's production at the Isaac Stern Auditorium involving over a hundred dancers and musicians and with the special participation of the Mariachi Academy of New York. For this concert, the brothers premiered several original compositions, including "Anochipa Tlalticpac" for chorus, jaranas, and pre-Columbian percussion.

Notable guest musicians included: Pedro da Silva guitar, Cristina Vásquez voice, Nilko Andreas Guarin guitar, Mauricio O'Reilly voice, Martin Vejarano percussion, Selene Muñoz voice, Adam Feder voice, Roman García voice, Jocelyn Medina voice, Verónica Valerio harp and voice Todd Carter voice, Yamani Fuentes flute, Lilly Lavner voice, Ramón Ponce Sr. trumpet, Ramón Ponce Jr. vihuela, Miguel Ponce guitarrón.

Collaboration with Calpulli Mexican Dance Company
From 2006 to 2009 Ernesto Villalobos served as musical director of Calpulli Mexican Dance Company. During these years, The Villalobos Brothers toured extensively with the company, performing with Dolly Parton at the Festival of Nations at Dollywood, at Queens Theatre in the Park, Mayo Center for the Performing Arts, Sarah Lawrence College, Colgate University, Museo del Barrio, Lehman Brothers Headquarters, Elmira College and Carnegie Hall.

Latin Grammy Appearance

The Villalobos Brothers appeared at The 7th Annual Latin Grammy Awards. They arranged and performed the music of Grammy winners: Graciela, Paloma San Basilio, León Gieco, César Camargo Mariano, Richie Ray & Bobby Cruz, Alberto Vázquez, Johnny Ventura and Rafael Escalona.

Critical reception and awards

Critical reception
The Villalobos Brothers have been acclaimed as violin virtuosos and one of the leading ensembles of world music. Critical comments on The Villalobos Brothers include:

Following a 12 November 2006, concert at Kaufman Center's Merkin Concert Hall in New York City, The Forward noted that "...they played with exuberant intensity for the appreciative audience...Ernesto returned his attention to his violin, his long, dark hair flying through the air as his bow raced across the strings....With their heads bowed as if in prayer, their fingers jumping and feet tapping, they weren't just playing music, they were living it..."

In 2009, their music was described as "High Octane Mexican Fiddling" by The New Victory Theater.

In 2007, they received the Tepeyac Association of New York's "Leaders of the Future Excellence Award" and were congratulated by United States Senators Hillary Rodham Clinton, John Sabini, Robert Menendez, Congressman Joseph Crowley, Governor Eliot Spitzer, Attorney General Andrew Cuomo and other American politicians.

Awards

 2011 – Bronze Medal for Best Documentary in the category of Social Issues at the New York Festivals International Radio Competition
 2007 – Leaders of the Future Award presented by the Tepeyac Association of New York
 2003 – Beca para Ejecutantes Fondo Nacional para la Cultura y las Artes FONCA (National Fund for Culture and Arts of Mexico)
 2000 – Fulbright Grant awarded to Ernesto Villalobos by the U.S. Department of State
 1999 – National Medal in Music awarded by the President of Mexico, Ernesto Zedillo Ponce de León
 1997 – Gold Medal at the Fifth National Violin Competition
 1995 – TELMEX Foundation Grant sponsored by business magnate and philanthropist Carlos Slim Helú

Discography

Solo
 The Villalobos Brothers, Villa-Lobos, 2009 (self-titled album) featuring: David Glukh, trumpet, Oscar Rosales, trumpet, Dave Hertzberg, bass, Samuel Zabaleta, drums.

Collaborations
 Hope Harris, Cousins Jamboree, 2010 (appear on), Holcomb Rock Road
 The Chieftains featuring Ry Cooder, San Patricio, 2010 (appear with Lila Downs), Hear Music
 In Memoriam: Allen Klein, The Best...Is Yet To Come, 2009 (arrangements, appear on), ABKCO Records
 Dan Zanes, Nueva York, 2008 (appear on), Festival Five Records
 The Shul Band, Instrumental, 2007 (appear on), Boom-Boom Studios
 Morley, Days Like These, 2006 (appear on), Universal Music-France
 Leni Stern, Love Comes Quietly, 2006 (collaboration with Adam Rudolph), Leni Stern Recordings
  Soundtrack: Viva la Vida, 2006 (appear on), Bay Street
 Vivian Farmery, Places, 2006 (appear on), Just Tell Advocacy
 The Looking, Tin Can Head, 2005 (appear on), Astraea Records
 Rene Hubbard, Chicavasco, 2005 (appear on), Rana Santacruz
 Lilly Lavner, Walking Away, 2004 (appear on), K-Studios
 The Shul Band, Alive at the Shul of New York, 2004 (appear on), K-Studios
 Eddie Palmieri, Ritmo Caliente, 2003 (appear on), Concord Records

Movies and documentaries

Original soundtracks
 Oscar Frasser, El Águila Negra, Original soundtrack composed by Luis Villalobos featuring tenor Román García, 2011 (compositions, arrangements, appear on), CUNY Short Films
  United Nations Radio, Gender Equality And 15 Year-Olds, Original soundtrack composed by Ernesto Villalobos featuring soprano Claudia Bianca Montes, 2010 (compositions, arrangements, appear on), United Nations Radio Unit, New York
 Caitlin McEwan, Moving Pictures, featuring , Original soundtrack composed by Alberto Villalobos, 2009 (compositions, arrangements, appear on), 12 Weeks 12 Films

Instrumentalists
 Richard Temtchine, a film writer and director, How to Seduce Difficult Women, Original soundtrack by Pedro da Silva, 2009 (appear on), Quadrant Entertainment
 , Harvest of Redemption, Original soundtrack by Richard Martinez 2007 (appear on), Chapa-Perez Entertainment
  Buscando a Miguel, Original soundtrack by Sebastián Cruz, 2007 (appear on), Hidden Eye Productions
 John J. Valadez and Cristina Ibarra, The Last Conquistador, Original soundtrack by Richard Martinez, 2007 (appear on), PBS Point of View

Plays
 Zona Rosa a play by Carlos Morton directed by Michael Barakiva. Music performed by The Villalobos Brothers at Queens Theatre in the Park 14 May 2011
 Desert Fathers a play by  directed by Jenny Sullivan. Original music by Jerry Korman and The Villalobos Brothers.
 The Roses on the Rocks a play by Ellen Boscov, directed by Richard Caliban. Original music by Rana Santacruz, performed by Alberto Villalobos
 Viva La Vida a play by Diane Shaffer directed by Susana Tubert. Original music by  Soundtrack: Viva la Vida, 2006 (appear on), Bay Street

Other performances and collaborations

National Dance Institute
In June 2008 The Villalobos Brothers were featured as soloists at the National Dance Institute's Event of the Year "Volando a México". This series of concerts involved over 200 dancers and musicians and told the story of two Mexican-American children living in New York City who fly to Mexico for the first time. This series was directed by Jenny Seham and the musical director was Jerry Korman. As part of this same event, they were also invited to appear in a short film by NDI's Artistic Director Jacques d'Amboise, The Children of the Roses.

Collaboration with Dan Zanes
On 17 January 2008, The Villalobos Brothers accompanied Grammy-winner Dan Zanes as part of Blue Country Heart: The Music of Hank Williamswith Jorma Kaukonen, G.E. Smith, Little Toby Walker, Larry Campbell, Marc Anthony Thompson, David Spelman, Sonia de los Santos and Barry Mitterhoff in a historic concert at Kaufman Center's Merkin Concert Hall in New York City.

Later that year, they also toured the West Coast of the US with him as part of the show Holiday House Party With Dan Zanes and Friends, making stops at the Moore Theatre, Mondavi Center Jackson Hall, Herbst Theatre, and ending with a three-week residency at the New Victory Theater on Broadway. As part of the tour The Villalobos Brothers played and sang Holiday music from their native Veracruz, and also shared the stage with Dan Zanes, Palestinian Arabic-jazz buzuq player Tareq Abboushi, drummer Colin Brooks, English designer and director Julian Crouch, Mexican guitarist and vocalist Sonia de los Santos, accordionist/saxophonist John Foti, renowned tap dancer Derick K. Grant, bass player Saskia Sunshine Lane, fiddler/trumpeter Elena Moon Park, vocalist Basya Schechter, and Palestinian percussionist/composer Zafer Tawil.

The Shul Band: Auschwitz-Birkenau Concentration Camps
The Villalobos Brothers have been frequent collaborators of The Shul Band, a klezmer band led by Adam Feder. In 2005 Ernesto Villalobos and Adam Feder led a candlelit vigil at the children's barracks inside the Auschwitz-Birkenau Memorial and Museum as part of Bernie Glassman's Bearing Witness Zen Peacemakers retreat 2005 in Oświęcim, Poland.

Town Hall Theater
On 30 November 2004, Ernesto Villalobos gave a soloist performance at The Town Hall Theater in Manhattan. This performance was the world premiere of La Promesa del Guerrero a symphonic piece written and performed by Ernesto Villalobos featuring tenor Mauricio O'Reilly. Ernesto was commissioned by conductor Alondra de la Parra and her orchestra, the Philharmonic Orchestra of the Americas. This 20-minute composition, was based on a poem by Manelick de la Parra, and it narrates the nahua legend of the Popocatépetl and Iztaccíhuatl mountains outside Mexico City. The concert marked the closing night of the 2004 Celebrate MexicoNOW! Festival organized by Claudia Norman (30 November 2004)

References

External links
 
 
 The Villalobos Brothers on iTunes
 The Villalobos Brothers on BandCamp
 The Villalobos Brothers on CD Baby
 
 
 The Villalobos Brothers' Official MySpace Website
 The Villalobos Brothers on Sonicbids

Chamber music groups
Contemporary classical music ensembles
Mexican folk music groups
Mariachi groups
Mexican pop music groups
Mexican rock music groups
Rock en Español music groups
World music groups